Faouzi Mansouri (17 January 1956 – 18 May 2022) was an Algerian professional footballer who played as a defender. He played mostly in France with Montpellier. For the Algeria national team he participated at two editions of FIFA World Cup, in 1982 and 1986.

Honours
Nîmes
Coupe Gambardella: 1977

Algeria
Africa Cup of Nations: third place 1984

References

External links
 

1956 births
2022 deaths
People from Djerba
Algerian footballers
Association football defenders
Algeria international footballers
Nîmes Olympique players
Montpellier HSC players
FC Mulhouse players
AS Béziers Hérault (football) players
Ligue 1 players
Ligue 2 players
1982 FIFA World Cup players
1986 FIFA World Cup players
1984 African Cup of Nations players
1986 African Cup of Nations players
Algerian expatriate footballers
Algerian expatriate sportspeople in France
Expatriate footballers in France
21st-century Algerian people